Willem Molijn (20 July 1874 – 9 June 1957) was a Dutch fencer. He competed in the individual épée event at the 1912 Summer Olympics.

References

External links
 

1874 births
1957 deaths
Dutch male épée fencers
Olympic fencers of the Netherlands
Fencers at the 1912 Summer Olympics
Sportspeople from Utrecht (city)
20th-century Dutch people